Live at Eden is a live EP by Doves, released on 26 April 2005 at select U.S. independent music stores only. All songs were recorded at the Eden Sessions, Cornwall, on 12 July 2002. The songs also feature in the live concert on the DVD Where We're Calling From.

Track listing

References

Doves (band) albums
2005 EPs